Divegavan is a village in the Karmala taluka of Solapur district in Maharashtra state, India.

Demographics
Covering  and comprising 207 households at the time of the 2011 census of India, Divegavan had a population of 983. There were 519 males and 464 females, with 98 people being aged six or younger.

References

Villages in Karmala taluka